Encompass Health Corporation, based in Birmingham, Alabama, is one of the United States' largest providers of post-acute healthcare services, offering both facility-based and home-based post-acute services in 36 states and Puerto Rico through its network of inpatient rehabilitation hospitals, home health agencies, and hospice agencies. Effective January 2, 2018, the organization changed its name to Encompass Health Corporation and its New York Stock Exchange (NYSE) ticker symbol from HLS to EHC.

In 2003, the U.S. Securities and Exchange Commission took action against the company's CEO, Richard M. Scrushy, who was accused of directing company employees to falsely report company earnings to meet stockholder expectations.

The company currently operates three divisions: inpatient rehabilitation, home health, and hospice. The company formerly operated an outpatient rehabilitation, surgery center and diagnostics division. The company also previously owned and operated several acute care hospitals that specialized in orthopedics, but sold all of those hospitals by 2006. The former outpatient division also operated an occupational medicine division until 2001, when it was sold. HealthSouth also sold its Long-term acute care facilities in May 2011. The long-term hospitals contributed around $200 million in revenue.

Company beginnings
 HealthSouth was incorporated in Birmingham, Alabama as a Delaware company on February 22, 1984, as Amcare, Inc. by its founder Richard M. Scrushy. The company opened its first facility in Little Rock, Arkansas and one in Birmingham later that year. In 1985 the company changed its name to HealthSouth Rehabilitation Corporation. In 1986, the company went public with its IPO on the NASDAQ Stock Exchange under the ticker symbol HSRC. At the end of the company's last investor roadshow presentation in New York City before its IPO, Scrushy received a standing ovation from the investment bankers in attendance, an extreme rarity. In September 1988, the company moved to the New York Stock Exchange and became listed under the symbol HRC. By 1990 the company had expanded to 50 facilities across the US. HealthSouth finished out 1992 with $400 million in annual revenue. In 1993, the company acquired 28 hospitals and 45 outpatient rehabilitation facilities from National Medical Enterprise for around $300 million in cash. In 1994, HealthSouth further expanded when it announced it would buy fellow Birmingham-based ReLife for $180 million in stock. In 1995, the company acquired Caremark Orthopedic Services.

Growth
Throughout the mid-1990s, HealthSouth expanded rapidly through mergers and acquisitions. In 1995, the company changed its name to HealthSouth Corporation to better reflect its diversified interests in healthcare. On August 31, 1995, HealthSouth CEO Richard Scrushy announced that HealthSouth was going to build a new headquarters on US Highway 280 in Birmingham. Southern Company had abandoned plans to build a corporate campus on the site, opting for an office complex further down Highway 280 in the Inverness area. The corporate campus plans included a five-story headquarters building with a connecting conference center, parking deck, print production building, and a campus land management building. HealthSouth was able save money on the site preparation by making use of the many improvements Southern Company had already made to the property, which included utilities and an access road. The company moved into the new headquarters building in December 1996.

In January 1995 the company entered the surgery center business with its $155 million acquisition of Surgical Health Corporation. One month later the company acquired Novacare's entire rehabilitational hospital business for $215 million in cash. In 1996 the company expanded into diagnostics with its purchase of Health Images Inc. In the beginning of 1996 the company adopted the slogan "The Healthcare Company of the 21st Century". Less than a year later the company adopted the "H" logo as its corporate identity. HealthSouth made its largest acquisition yet when it purchased Horizon/CMS for $1.8 billion in 1997. A few months later after the acquisition, HealthSouth sold the long-term care assets of Horizon/CMS it did not need to Integrated Health Services for $1.15 billion in cash. HealthSouth along with many Healthcare publications called this the "deal of the century". Also in February 1997 the company finally moved into its new corporate headquarters. The headquarters building itself contained a company store and museum. HealthSouth continued on its acquisition spree through 1999 by purchasing the majority of Columbia/HCA's surgical division.

In 2001 the company announced it would, along with Oracle Corporation, build the world's first all-digital hospital on its corporate campus. The 13 story structure was meant as a replacement for its aging HealthSouth Medical Center in downtown Birmingham. Construction began soon after on the new HealthSouth Medical Center.

Accounting scandal

The first of HealthSouth's accounting problems surfaced in late 2002 after CEO Richard M. Scrushy sold $75 million in stock several days before the company posted a large loss. HealthSouth was accused by the U.S. Securities and Exchange Commission (SEC) of an accounting scandal where the company's earnings were falsely inflated by $1.4 billion. In 1996, Scrushy allegedly instructed the company's senior officers and accountants to falsify company earnings reports in order to meet investor expectations and control the price of the company's stock. The fraud continued for seven years.  In certain fiscal years, the company's income was overstated by as much as 4700%. The $1.4 billion represents more than 10% of the company's total assets.  At one point, the company's corporate taxes—based on its fraudulent earnings—were higher than its actual earnings.

In 1998, HealthSouth was accused of violation of the Securities Exchange Act by failing to disclose negative trends and misrepresenting company's financial information.

In 2003, the U.S. Securities and Exchange Commission took action against HealthSouth regarding a corporate accounting scandal, in which its founder, chairman, and chief executive officer, Richard M. Scrushy, was accused of directing company employees to falsely report grossly exaggerated company earnings in order to meet stockholder expectations. In March 2003, HealthSouth's CEO Richard M. Scrushy was charged with the accounting fraud and the SEC announced it was investigating whether Scrushy's stock sell was related to HealthSouth posting a large loss.

HealthSouth hired an outside law firm to review Scrushy's stock sale, with the firm concluding that the sale and profit loss were not related, although this did not take the company off the SEC's radar. On the evening of March 18, 2003 FBI agents executed search warrants at the company's headquarters after the company's chief financial officer William Owens agreed to wear a wire in a failed attempt to get Scrushy to talk about the fraud.

The board of directors worked vigorously on rectifying the accounting issues, starting with the termination of CEO Scrushy in 2003 and paying $325 million in 2004 regarding allegations of the company having defrauded various federal healthcare programs.

In June 2005, Scrushy was acquitted on all 36 of the accounting fraud counts against him, most notably one count in violation of the Sarbanes-Oxley Act. By mid-to-late 2006, HealthSouth, which avoided filing for Chapter 11 Bankruptcy Protection, completed its recovery and relisted its stock on the New York Stock Exchange under the symbol HLS. In 2009, Scrushy was sued for fraud by HealthSouth investors and ordered to repay his company $2.8 billion.

Recovery and the new HealthSouth/Encompass Health

Following the raid at the company's corporate headquarters, the board of directors held an emergency meeting to discuss changes moving forward. One of the first actions was the termination of Richard Scrushy as chairman and CEO, and William Owens as CFO. Robert P. May was elected as interim CEO and Joel C. Gordon as chairman. Another issue that was immediately addressed by the board was the means by which it would obtain the cash for interest payments of senior bonds and principal payments due on a $344 million convertible bond. The board agreed that the company's cash flow problems were too great to tackle on its own. At the advice of its lender JPMorgan Chase, the company hired restructuring firm Alvarez and Marsal to bring its finances in order and immediately appointed Bryan Marsal Chief Restructuring Officer. By the end of 2003, the company had most of its finances reorganized and was able to avoid Chapter 11 bankruptcy.

Efforts were made at the corporate headquarters to eradicate all signs of the prior existence of Scrushy within the company. The board removed Scrushy's name from the conference center, closed the company store and museum and opened the fifth floor executive offices to all employees, which, during Scrushy's tenure, had been kept away. The board also sold all but a few of the company's eleven corporate aircraft, which included a Gulfstream V and a Sikorsky S-76 C+ helicopter. In an effort to save money, the company halted construction of its Digital Hospital, for which building costs had doubled, to $400 million. On May 10, 2004, Jay Grinney was chosen by the board as the company's permanent CEO. Soon after Grinney's appointment, the company moved forward with its goal of again becoming a current filer with the SEC. By doing so, the company restated earnings from 2000 to 2003. The company also sold or closed many underperforming facilities, including its medical center division, in its effort to return to profitability.

On May 15, 2006, the company completed its goal of once again becoming a current filer with the SEC when it filed its first quarter 2006 financial result. It was the first time the company had filed a 10-Q since its accounting scandal began. On August 14, 2006, the company unveiled its restructuring plan which included the sell, spin-off or other disposition of its surgery, outpatient, and diagnostic divisions, along with a 1-for-5 reverse stock split, to coincide with its relisting on the New York Stock Exchange under the symbol HLS. The reverse stock split was approved by stock holders at a special meeting at the company's corporate headquarters on October 18, 2006. The last step in HealthSouth's recovery from its accounting scandal occurred on October 26, 2006, when it was again relisted on the New York Stock Exchange.

On January 29, 2007, the company announced it would sell its more than 600 outpatient centers to Select Medical Corporation for $245 million in cash. The transaction was completed on May 1, 2007.

On March 26, 2007, HealthSouth announced it would sell its surgery center division to private investment partnership TPG Capital for $920 million in cash and equity interest in the newly formed company worth between $25 to $30 million. The surgery center division comprised 139 outpatient surgery centers and three surgical hospitals. It was also announced that the new surgery center company would remain headquartered in Birmingham. The transaction was completed on June 30, 2007, with the creation of Surgical Care Affiliates.

On April 29, 2007, HealthSouth announced a definitive agreement to sell its diagnostic division to the Gores Group for $47.5 million. It was also announced that the newly formed company was to remain in Birmingham. The transaction was completed on July 31, 2007, with Diagnostic Health Corporation being formed.

In July 2010, HealthSouth gave the American Cancer Society of Alabama the black V-12 2000 BMW 750iL, a bullet-proof sedan that HealthSouth purchased for security reasons under former CEO Richard Scrushy. Scrushy bought the car from HealthSouth in 2003 after an accounting scandal broke. Scrushy also owned a maroon 2000 bullet-proof V-12 BMW 750iL that was sold in 2009 by HealthSouth as part of a civil judgment against Scrushy. In 2009, HealthSouth had obtained ownership of Scrushy's black 2000 BMW 750iL.

In 2014, HealthSouth purchased Encompass Home Health and Hospice.

Affiliated companies

Offspring companies
MedPartners, Inc. — a pharmacy practice management company founded by the HealthSouth and Scrushy, today the company is known as CVS Caremark, a unit of CVS Health.
Capstone Capital Corporation — a real estate investment trust founded by HealthSouth
Diagnostic Health Corporation — former diagnostic imaging division
SourceMedical Solutions — healthcare technology systems founded by HealthSouth
Surgical Care Affiliates — former surgery center division

Previously affiliated companies
21st Century Health Ventures (Birmingham, Alabama) — founded by Scrushy and former HealthSouth CEO Michael Martin.
GG Enterprises (Hoover, Alabama) — founded by Scrushy's mother and brother.
Go for It! Roadshow — a children's health education tour and television series sponsored by HealthSouth
MedCenterDirect.com (Atlanta, Georgia) — HealthSouth bought 6.4 million shares of this hospital supplies company.
HealthTronics Surgical Services Inc. (Marietta, Georgia) — Michael Martin was director while CFO at HealthSouth.
Total Nonstop Action Wrestling LLC. (Nashville, Tennessee)- Healthsouth was a major financial contributor but dropped support for the company in October 2002 amid the accounting scandal.
Integrated Health Services Inc. (Sparks, Maryland) — a nursing homes and rehabilitation center company that Scrushy was a director of in the 1990s.

References

External links

SEC litigation release – SEC Charges HealthSouth Corp., CEO Richard Scrushy With $1.4 Billion Accounting Fraud
Birmingham News Special Report on the HealthSouth Scandal

American companies established in 1984
1984 establishments in Alabama
Companies based in Birmingham, Alabama
Companies listed on the New York Stock Exchange
Hospital networks in the United States
Rehabilitation medicine organizations based in the United States
Fraud in the United States
Medical and health organizations based in Alabama